The Providence City Council is the fifteen-member legislative body of the city of Providence, Rhode Island. The two major responsibilities of the council are enacting ordinances necessary to ensure the welfare and good order of the city and adopting the city's annual budget. Providence uses a strong-mayor form of government in which the city council acts as a check against the power of the executive branch, the mayor.

The members of the Providence City Council are elected by residents of the fifteen wards of Providence. City Council members are elected to four-year terms and are limited, by City Charter, to serving a maximum of three consecutive full terms (excluding any partial term of less than two years previously served). Council members represent the concerns, needs, and issues of their constituents, and work to improve the city's neighborhoods.

City Council members, by ward
The current City Council consists of: 
Ward 1: John Goncalves
Ward 2: Helen Anthony
Ward 3: Susan Anderbois
Ward 4: Justin Roias
Ward 5: Jo-Ann Ryan
Ward 6: Miguel Sanchez
Ward 7: Ana Vargas
Ward 8: James Taylor
Ward 9: Juan Pichardo
Ward 10: Pedro Espinal
Ward 11: Mary Kay Harris
Ward 12: Althea Graves
Ward 13: Rachel Miller
Ward 14: Shelley Peterson
Ward 15: Oscar Vargas
All fifteen members of the council are members of the Democratic Party.

External links
 Providence City Council official website

Organizations based in Providence, Rhode Island
Government of Providence, Rhode Island
City councils in the United States